K3 was a public television channel operated by Televisió de Catalunya  available in analogue and DTT in  Catalonia, Balearic Islands, Valencia, Andorra, Northern Catalonia and partly in Aragón.

K3 was born in 2001 from the re-estructuration of TVC's second channel, Canal 33, that split it in two channels that shared the same frequency: 33 and K3. While this was valid for analogue broadcasting, the DDT broadcasting changed in December 2006. 33 got the old frequency on its own, while K3 shared its multiplex slot with the 300 channel.

K3 was a children/teenagers channel, that usually broadcasts from morning to 21:30 on weekdays and a couple of hours around midday on the weekend. It broadcast both entertainment and educational programs, with a wide range of ages. Early morning were usually dedicated to younger children, while the afternoon is more devoted to teenagers.

On 17 October 2009 the channel was replaced by Canal Super 3.

Broadcast programming

Anime 

 Arc the Lad
 Azuki
 Ai Yori Aoshi
 Bleach
 Bobobo
 Dragon Ball
 Dragon Ball Z
 Dragon Ball GT
 Boys Be...
 Death Note
 Candy Candy
 Space Pirate Captain Harlock
 City Hunter
 Clamp School Detectives 
 Comic Party
 Future Boy Conan
 Corrector Yui
 Cowboy Bebop
 Detective Conan
 DNA²
 Doctor Slump
 Domo-kun
 Doraemon
 New Doctor Slump
 King Arthur
 The Twelve Kingdoms
 Escaflowne
 Magic User's Club
 FLCL
 Dragon Quest: Dai no Daibōken
 Fruits Basket
 Fushigi Yûgi
 Get Backers
 Georgie!
 Harley Spiny
 Ninja Hattori-kun
 I My Me! Strawberry Eggs
 Inuyasha
 Phantom Thief Jeanne
 Karekano
 Sgt. Frog
 Kimagure Orange Road
 Kiteretsu
 Kochikame
 Kamichama Karin
 Chō Kuse ni Narisō
 The Law of Ueki
 Lady Oscar
 Urusei Yatsura
 Mischievous Twins: The Tales of St. Clare's
 Love Hina
 Ojamajo Doremi
 Maison Ikkoku
 Maya the Honey Bee
 Mega Man
 Monster
 Musculman
 Nana 
 Neo Ranga
 Neon Genesis Evangelion
 Ninja Boy Rantaro
 Ninja Hattori-kun
 NieA_7
 Nono-chan
 One Piece
 Sorcerous Stabber Orphen
 Planetes
 You're Under Arrest
 Ranma ½
 Remi
 Sailor Moon
 Cardcaptor Sakura
 Sakura Wars
 Samurai Champloo
 Serial Experiments Lain
 Shin Chan
 Slam Dunk
 Taro the Space Alien
 Trigun
 Tsubasa: Reservoir Chronicle
 Revolutionary Girl Utena
 Vicky the Viking
 Viewtiful Joe
 Yawara!
 Yu Yu Hakusho

Cartoons

 Waldo's way
 Avatar: The Last Airbender
 Animated Tales of the World 
 Angela Anaconda
 Bandolero
 Billy the Cat
 Blinky Bill
 Bob the Builder
 Braceface
 Calamity Jane
 Code Lyoko
 Charlie Brown & Snoopy Show
 Cliff Hanger
 Clyde
 Xiaolin Showdown
 Tales from the Cryptkeeper
 Cyrano 2022
 Dennis the Menace
 Delfy and His Friends
 Doc Eureka
 Enigma
 Galactik Football
 Fantomcat
 The Flintstones
 Juanito Jones
 Inspector Gadget
 Inspector mouse
 Oscar's Orchestra
 La brigada dels fossers
 La bruixa Avorrida
 The Pink Panther Show
 Chicken Minute
 Rocko's Modern Life
 Les aventures d'en Massagran
 The Adventures of Tintin
 The Triplets
 Wolves, Witches and Giants
 The Fruitties
 Lucky Luke
 Iris, The Happy Professor
 Roger Ramjet
 Hoppity Hooper
 Bobobobs
 Loggerheads
 Wacky Races
 Howdi Gaudi
 The Hoobs
 The Fruitties
 Braceface
 Jacob Two-Two
 Garfield and Friends
 CatDog
 Freaky Stories
 Make Way for Noddy
 Martin Mystery
 Mega Man
 Mona the Vampire
 Aaahh!!! Real Monsters
 Montana Jones
 Jabberjaw
 Kampung Boy
 Kaput and Zösky
 Norman Normal
 Hey Arnold!
 Oggy and the Cockroaches (Season 1-3)
 Papyrus
 Princess Shéhérazade
 Pingu
 Pirate Family
 Chirpy the sparrow
 Pocket Dragons
 Poochini
 Popeye the Sailor
 ReBoot
 The Ren & Stimpy Show
 Rocket Power
 The Rocky and Bullwinkle Show
 Rolie Polie Olie
 Rubbadubbers
 Scruff
 Scooby-Doo
 Space Goofs
 Spirou
 Stanley
 Sylvan
 Tabaluga
 Teletubbies
 Teo
 All Dogs Go to Heaven: The Series
 Teenage Mutant Ninja Turtles
 Totally Spies!
 Twipsy
 Una mà de contes
 X-Men
 X-DuckX
 Xiaolin Showdown
 10+2

Shows 

 Beverly Hills, 90210
 Babylon 5
 Celebrity Deathmatch
 Daria
 Doctor Who
 Downtown
 Edgemont
 Dr. Katz, Professional Therapist
 Beakman's World
 The Fresh Prince of Bel-Air
 Bewitched
 Farscape
 Hollyoaks
 Kenan & Kel
 Lizzie McGuire
 Parker Lewis Can't Lose
 Rex the Runt
 Rin=Dim
 As If
 Stargate
 Get Smart
 Thunderbirds
 Undergrads
 Zoe, Duncan, Jack and Jane

See also
Televisió de Catalunya

External links
Official Site 

Televisió de Catalunya
Catalan-language television stations
Television stations in Catalonia
Television channels and stations established in 2001
Television channels and stations disestablished in 2009